Preslia is a peer-reviewed scientific journal publishing original research papers on plant systematics, morphology, phytogeography, ecology and vegetation science, with a geographical focus on central Europe. It has been published by the Czech Botanical Society since 1914. The journal is named in honour of Bohemian botanists, brothers Jan Svatopluk Presl (1791–1849) and Karel Bořivoj Presl (1794–1852).

References

External links

 Preslia at SCImago Journal Rank

Botany journals
English-language journals
Publications established in 1914